The  (IHA) is an agency of the government of Japan in charge of state matters concerning the Imperial Family, and also the keeping of the Privy Seal and State Seal of Japan.

The Agency is unique among conventional government agencies and ministries, in that it does not directly report to the Prime Minister at the cabinet level, nor is it affected by legislation that establishes it as an Independent Administrative Institution.

Organization and functions
The IHA is headed by the Director-General of IHA, assisted by the Deputy Director of IHA, appointed by the Cabinet. The main organizational positions within the Agency are:

 the Grand Steward's Secretariat
 the Board of Chamberlains
 the Crown Prince's Household
 the Board of Ceremonies
 the Archives and Mausolea Department
 the Maintenance and Works Department
 the Kyoto Office

The Agency's headquarters is located within the grounds of the Imperial Palace in Tokyo. The Agency's duties and responsibilities encompass the daily activities of the Imperial household, such as state visits, organised events, preservation of traditional culture and administrative functions, amongst other responsibilities. The Agency is also responsible for the various Imperial residences located throughout Japan, and also organises guided tours for visitors who wish to tour the Tokyo Imperial Palace, the Kyoto Imperial Palace, the Katsura Detached Palace, and other residences and locations falling under the IHA's remit.

The Agency also holds responsibility for the health, security and travel arrangements of the Imperial family, including maintaining the Imperial line. The Board of the Chamberlains, headed by the Grand Chamberlain, manages the daily life of the Emperor and the Empress, and also holds responsibility for keeping the Privy Seal and State Seal of Japan. The Grand Master of the Board of the Crown Prince's Household helps manage the schedules, dining menus, and household maintenance of the Crown Prince and his family.

History

The Imperial Household Agency traces its origins back to institutions established by the Taihō Code (or more formally) promulgated in 701–702 AD. The basic structures remained in place until the Meiji Restoration (1868).

Meiji period
Though the names are occasionally differentiated in English as the "Imperial Household Agency", versus the former, Meiji period "Ministry of the Imperial Household", both names are rendered with no differentiation in Japanese. However, there is a convoluted history of reorganization around how the government bodies that correspond to constituent subdivisions of the current Agency were formed or empowered during this period.

Since then, the name has remained unchanged and is, today, headed by the Master of Ceremonies.

An Imperial Order in 1908 confirmed that the Imperial Household Minister, as the chief official was then called, held responsible for assisting the Emperor in all matters concerning the Imperial House. The ministry also oversaw the official appointments of Imperial Household Artists and commissioned their work.

Imperial Household Office, 1947–1949
The , a downgraded version of the ministry, was created pursuant to  Law No. 70 of 1947 during the American Occupation of Japan. Its number of staff was downscaled from 6,200 to less than 1,500, and the Office was placed under the Prime Minister of Japan.

Imperial Household Agency, 1949–present
In 1949, Imperial Household Office was renamed to the Imperial Household Agency, and placed under the fold of the newly created , as an external agency attached to it.

Criticism
The Agency has been criticized for isolating members of the Imperial Family from the Japanese public, and for insisting on stiffly preserved customs, rather than permitting a more approachable, populist monarchy.

In May 2004, Prince Naruhito criticised the then-Grand Steward of the Imperial Household, for putting pressure on Princess Masako, 's wife, to bear a male child. At a press conference,  stated that his wife had "completely exhausted herself" trying to adapt to the Imperial family's life, and added "there were developments that denied 's career (up to our marriage) as well as her personality." It has officially been stated that  is suffering from an "adjustment disorder", but there has been extensive speculation in the press that she is suffering from clinical depression as a result of her treatment by Imperial Household officials.

Increasingly in recent years, the Agency's prevention of archaeological research regarding a large number (more than 740) of Kofun Period tombs claimed to be and designated as "Imperial" has come under criticism from academics. The tombs, located in the Kansai region of western Japan, are considered by many academics as potentially holding important historical information on the origins of Japanese civilization; however, the possibility that these potential finds could verify or further solidify theories of formative civilizational ties with contemporary civilizations in China and the Korean Peninsula, with these civilizations potentially having as much influence on the origins of the Imperial Household itself, is generally considered to be a considerable contributing factor to the ongoing prevention of archaeological research at these sites by the IHA, with a large number of the tombs considered by some to be imperial only in name.

Grand Stewards
The Imperial Household Agency is headed by the Grand Steward (Article 8-1), whose appointment or dismissal is subject to the Emperor's approval (Article 8-2).

The Grand Steward is vested with comprehensive control over administrate activities within the Agency, and supervisory authority over the service performance of the staff (8–3). He is empowered to interact with the Prime Minister on matters pertaining to the Agency's authorized duties, either requesting the issuance of Cabinet Office ordinances (8–3), or notifying him on pertinent matters (8–4). He has the authorization to hand down orders or directives to staff members of government organs under the agency's direct control (8–6), and may also request the Commissioner General of the National Police Agency to take appropriate measures regarding administrative duties that involve the civilian .

The Grand Stewardship is a post customarily filled by former  (≒permanent secretaries) at one of several internal affairs (home affairs) type ministries and agencies, or someone with a closely approximating  (e.g., Superintendent General of the Tokyo Metropolitan Police Department), after having served as Vice-Grand Steward.

See also
 Imperial Household Law
 Chamberlain of Japan
 Lord Keeper of the Privy Seal of Japan
 Imperial Household Department, China
 Matsushiro Underground Imperial Headquarters
 Office of the Yi Dynasty, also known as Ri Oshoku (李王職), which was part of the Imperial Household Ministry during 1911-1945.

Explanatory notes

Citations

References
(2007). : Last Meiji Man. Lanham, Maryland: Rowman & Littlefield. /;

Further reading
 . (1986). The Imperial Family of Japan. Tokyo: International Society for Educational Information.

External links
 

 
Cabinet Office (Japan)
Chiyoda, Tokyo
Japanese monarchy
Ministries established in 1949
1949 establishments in Japan
Royal households